Ottobiano is a comune (municipality) in the Province of Pavia in the Italian region Lombardy, located about  southwest of Milan and about  west of Pavia.

Ottobiano borders the following municipalities: Ferrera Erbognone, Lomello, San Giorgio di Lomellina, Tromello, Valeggio.

Demographic evolution

Notable people
Victorio Codovilla (1894–1970), communist politician

References

Cities and towns in Lombardy